The Immigration Act 2014 is an Act of Parliament of the United Kingdom. It received Royal Assent on 14 May 2014. The act makes provision to prevent private landlords from renting houses to people without legal status, to prevent illegal immigrants from obtaining driving licences and bank accounts and for the investigation of sham marriages.

Only six Labour MPs opposed the act; Diane Abbott, Jeremy Corbyn, Kelvin Hopkins, John McDonnell, Fiona Mactaggart and Dennis Skinner.

The act removes key protections for Commonwealth citizens residing in the United Kingdom that existed in the Immigration and Asylum Act 1999 which was a major preceding factor in the Windrush scandal that involved at least 83 wrongful deportations.

References

United Kingdom Acts of Parliament 2014